Athol Island is a small island in the Bahamas, which lies  east of Paradise Island, which lies directly off of New Providence island. The island is uninhabited. The island is part of the National Marine Park. The nearby waters of the island are often used for snorkeling.

References

External links
Athol Island
ATHOL ISLAND NATIONAL PARK Petition

Uninhabited islands of the Bahamas